The Crossville Chronicle is a newspaper in Crossville, Tennessee that provides news coverage of Cumberland County and surrounding areas. It was founded in 1886, and publishes on Tuesdays and Fridays.

See also
List of newspapers in Tennessee

References

Publications established in 1886
1886 establishments in Tennessee
Cumberland County, Tennessee